Sucy-en-Brie (literally Sucy in Brie) is a commune in the southeastern suburbs of Paris, France.

Population

Transport
Sucy-en-Brie is served by Sucy–Bonneuil station on Paris RER line A.

Education
Public primary schools in the commune include:
9 preschools (maternelles) and one private preschool
8 elementary schools and one private elementary school

Public secondary schools in the commune include:
 Junior high schools: Collège du Fort and Collège du Parc
 Senior high schools/sixth-form colleges: Lycée Christoph Colombe and Lycée des Métiers Hôteliers Montaleau
In addition Lycée Guillaume Budé is in nearby Limeil-Brévannes.

There is one private Catholic school, Ensemble scolaire du Petit-Val, which covers levels preschool through senior high.

Personalities
Christophe Lemoine, voice actor
Nicolas Maurice-Belay, footballer
Angelin Preljocaj (1957), dancer and choreographer
Claude Serre (1938-1998), cartoonist

Twin towns
It is twinned with Camberley in Surrey, England as well as Scituate, Massachusetts.

See also
Communes of the Val-de-Marne department

References

External links
Official website 

Communes of Val-de-Marne